At the 1904 Summer Olympics, twenty-five athletics events were contested. A total of 74 medals (25 gold, 25 silver and 24 bronze) were awarded.

Multi-event competitions, the all-around and triathlon, were introduced, along with a 56-pound weight throw, while the short steeplechase was lengthened slightly from 2500 to 2590 metres, the team race was lengthened from 5000 meters to 4 miles, and the long steeplechase was dropped.

In all, the 25 events featured in 1904 were 2 more than were held in 1900.

A track was built specifically for the Games on the campus of Washington University in St. Louis. The cinder track was 1/3 mile in length with one long straightaway.

Medal summary

Medal table

Participating nations

233 athletes from 11 nations competed. This figure includes the athletic triathlon event, which some sources exclude.

Marathon

The marathon was the most bizarre event of the Games. It was run in brutally hot weather, over dusty roads, with horses and automobiles clearing the way and creating dust clouds.

The first to arrive at the finish line was Frederick Lorz, who actually rode the rest of the way in a car to retrieve his clothes, after dropping out after nine miles, but after the car broke down at the 19th mile, he re-entered the race and jogged back to the finish line.

As officials and fans believed he had won the race, Lorz played along with his practical joke until he was found out shortly before the medal ceremony. He admitted the ruse,  and was banned for life by the AAU; however, after Lorz apologized for this stunt and it was found he had no intention to defraud, he was reinstated, and won the 1905 Boston Marathon.

Thomas Hicks was the first to the finish legally, after having received from his trainers several doses of strychnine sulfate (a common rat poison, which stimulates the nervous system in small doses) mixed with egg whites and brandy. While he was supported by his trainers when he crossed the finish line, he is still considered the winner: Hicks had to be carried off the track on a stretcher, and possibly would have died in the stadium had he not been treated by several doctors. He lost eight pounds during the course of the marathon.

A Cuban postman named Felix Carvajal joined the marathon, arriving at the last minute. He had to run in street clothes that a fellow runner cut around the legs to make them look like shorts. He stopped off in an orchard en route to have a snack on some apples which turned out to be rotten, and caused him to have to lie down and take a nap. Despite falling ill from the apples, he finished in fourth place.

References

External links
 International Olympic Committee results database

 
1904 Summer Olympics events
1904
International track and field competitions hosted by the United States
Olympics